The Jackal is a fictional character, the principal antagonist of the novel The Day of the Jackal by Frederick Forsyth. He is an assassin who is contracted by the OAS French terrorist group of the early 1960s to kill Charles de Gaulle, the President of France. The book was published on 7 June 1971, in the year following de Gaulle's death, and became an instant bestseller. In the 1973 original film adaptation, he is portrayed by Edward Fox. A revised version of the character was portrayed by Bruce Willis in the 1997 remake adaptation of the original film, having a divergent storyline and set in the U.S., with the First Lady of the United States, Emily Cowan, as target of the assassination.

Biographical summary

Main novel plot
As the story opens, the Jackal plans to continue working as an assassin until he has enough money to retire. The money paid him for assassinating two German engineers, thus delaying the development of Gamal Abdel Nasser's Al Zarifa rocket, had been enough to keep him in luxury for several years, but the offer of US$500,000 (about US$3.5 million in 2021 dollars) from the OAS to kill de Gaulle gives him the opportunity to retire early. Despite his concern over the "security slackness of the OAS", he finds the job too tempting to turn down. However, he insists that the OAS commanders in charge of the plot must not disclose the matter to anybody, and suggests they stay somewhere under heavy guard until the assassination is complete.

The assassin invents the codename of "the Jackal" after he is hired by the OAS conspirators. When asked for his choice of codename in the novel, the Jackal replies: "Since we have been speaking of hunting, what about the Jackal? Will that do?".

Taking elaborate precautions, the Jackal applies for a passport (based on an infant whose birthday is very close to his own but who died at a young age) and seeks out forged identity documents to get him into France to get him close to de Gaulle. He also steals two passports as contingent identities and purchases disguises to match, as well as a specially made sniper rifle. He kills the forger, who attempts to blackmail him for more money. He later goes to France to reconnoitre the best location and does research about de Gaulle, before concluding that the best time to kill him is on Liberation Day.

The French Action Service is able to capture and interrogate one of the plotter's bodyguards, one of the few men who is broadly aware of a plot, if not the actual details. Through Kowalski, the Action Service is not only made aware of the plot, but the Jackal's code name and a broad description. Roger Frey, the Minister of the Interior of France, convenes a meeting of all the heads of the department of state security, but all the men are at a loss as to how to proceed, until a Commissioner of the Police Judiciare suggests that the first and most important objective is to establish the true identity of the Jackal, which is something that only pure detective work can accomplish. When the Minister of the Interior asks him for the best detective in France, he suggests to the committee that the best detective is his own deputy, Claude Lebel.

Using OAS agent "Valmy" as a cut-out, the Jackal is kept fully informed of the French police's pursuit of him. Meanwhile, Lebel relies on his old boy network of police departments in several foreign countries to instigate a search for the Jackal. The Special Branch of England investigate and finds out there was a man named Charles Calthrop who was rumoured to have killed Rafael Trujillo some years ago using a precision sniper rifle. They find six men named 'Charles Calthrop', with one individual in particular raising some suspicion when it is discovered he has gone on holiday, leaving his passport in his house in the process. This passport, together with the fact that Jackal in French is 'Chacal' (the first three letters of his first name and last name respectively), causes the English to assume that this specific Charles Calthrop is the assassin.

On two occasions when the police get too close, the Jackal hides out in the home of a stranger he has seduced; once with a wealthy woman and again with a gay man he meets in a bar. He kills the former when she finds the components of his weapon, and the latter after the man watches a news report displaying the Jackal's photograph and describing him as a fugitive murderer.

Finally, on 25 August 1963, Liberation Day, the Jackal poses as a handicapped veteran and tries to shoot de Gaulle with his rifle, which he had hidden inside a stainless steel crutch. However, de Gaulle unexpectedly moves his head at the last moment, causing the Jackal to miss by a fraction of an inch. As the Jackal prepares for a second shot, he is discovered by French police detective Claude Lebel, who has been pursuing him since the plot was discovered. He uses his second shot to kill a CRS trooper who accompanied Lebel to the room, but the unarmed Lebel shoots and kills him with the security guard's MAT-49 before the Jackal can load his third and last bullet. The Jackal is buried two days later in an unmarked grave; only Lebel attends, anonymously. The death certificate identifies him as "an unknown foreign tourist, killed in a car accident".

In the epilogue, Charles Calthrop arrives home from vacation to find British police raiding his flat. He demands to know what is happening and is brought to the police post for interrogation. It is subsequently established that Calthrop was indeed on a holiday and this particular man is completely unconnected with the killer. Both the film and the novel end with the same comment by British authorities: "If the Jackal wasn't Calthrop, then who the hell was he?"

Appearance
The Jackal is described as a tall, blond Englishman in his early thirties living in Mayfair, London. The character's real name is unknown and details of his background are sketchy. Forsyth explains in the novel, "Alexander Duggan who died at the age of two and a half years in 1931 ... would have been a few months older than the Jackal in July 1963". He is described by Forsyth as six feet tall, with a muscular build and few distinguishing features, one of which is his cold grey eyes. In the novel, it is stated he likes to wear striped shirts. During the course of the novel he changes his hair colour frequently.

Abilities and skills
The Jackal uses a numbered Swiss bank account to hold the proceeds of his work. He is a careful, sophisticated and meticulous killer who plans every detail of each assassination well in advance. He has multiple successful contracts, but no record or file on any European police force whatsoever. During the course of the novel he contacts a Congo mercenary called Louis, whom he met in Katanga as a character reference and who puts the Jackal in touch with a skilled armourer who fabricates the assassin's rifle and a forger who provides false identification papers. In order to get a false identification paper, the Jackal gives his own driver's licence to the forger with the claim that the card belongs to a dead man; when the forger tries to blackmail him for more money, the Jackal kills him.

The Jackal speaks fluent French and is sufficiently skilled in hand-to-hand combat that he can kill with his bare hands. He is skilled with handguns and a marksman with a rifle. He has managed to remain anonymous except to those select few who recommend him for an assignment. He considers his anonymity his main weapon and prefers to carry out missions alone.

In the novel, the international police forces hunting him speculate that he may have helped assassinate Rafael Leónidas Trujillo in the Dominican Republic by shooting the driver of his armoured car, causing it to crash into the trap in which Trujillo was, in fact, killed. The 1973 film version tells not only was he involved in Trujillo's death but also killed a V.I.P. identified only as "that fellow from the Congo" (implicitly Patrice Lumumba, whose murder in the novel was committed by another assassin considered by the OAS).  

Before he is approached by the OAS, the Jackal's only known confirmed kills are of two German rocket scientists in Egypt, who were helping Gamal Abdel Nasser build rockets to attack Israel. He performed this task at close range using a small-calibre weapon, a crime that left the Egyptian government furious and baffled. The Jackal was paid by a Zionist millionaire in New York, who considered his money "well spent".

Identities
The Jackal's true name always remains a mystery: it is never discovered by the authorities or revealed to the reader, despite the police force apprehending various characters who have a similar name. He uses the following identities in the course of the novel:
 Alexander James Quentin "Alex" Duggan: This is the name of a boy who was born in 1929, the same year that the Jackal was born, but died aged two and a half in a car accident. The Jackal obtains Duggan's birth certificate under false pretences and applies for a passport in this name but with his own photograph and details.
 Per Jensen: A pastor from Copenhagen who bears a reasonable resemblance to the Jackal but is older with iron grey hair and gold-rimmed spectacles. The Jackal steals Pastor Jensen's passport from his London hotel room and adopts the disguise after his cover as Duggan is blown by both the French police and a woman he seduces and hides out with has found the components of his weapon.
 Martin "Marty" Schulberg: A student from Syracuse University who also somewhat resembles the Jackal, but is younger with chestnut brown hair and heavy-rimmed executive spectacles. The Jackal steals Schulberg's handgrip containing his passport from London airport and adopts the disguise when he realises the police must be on to Jensen, enhancing his cover to avoid them by posing as a flamboyant homosexual.
 André Martin: A fictitious French war veteran from Alsace-Lorraine, Martin is in his 50s and has only one leg, necessitating walking around with an aluminium crutch. This particular identity is central to the assassination plot. The Jackal becomes Martin — complete with French identity card and war wounded card courtesy of a Belgian forger — by dyeing his hair grey and cutting it badly, swallowing a couple of pieces of cordite to make himself sick and take on a pale complexion, and folding his leg back and binding it with a webbing strap to mimic an amputated leg.
 Charles Calthrop: Charles Calthrop is the name of a former small-arms salesman who was in the Dominican Republic at the time Rafael Leónidas Trujillo was shot. When Lebel uses his old boy network contacts to instigate a manhunt, he contacts Special Branch, and a member of SB later contacts the SIS. The Secret Intelligence Service, in turn, uncover a rumour that Calthrop has helped the partisans kill Trujillo by shooting the driver of his armoured car, causing it to crash and allowing his assassins to finish him off. The British police in the book surmise that Calthrop is the Jackal's real name, until the real Calthrop shows up at the end, after the Jackal has been killed. The authorities were misled by the fact that chacal (i.e., Cha[rles] Cal[throp]) is French for "jackal".  Police investigations show that the real Charles Calthrop went on a holiday with what looked like fishing rods in his car, which cause them to jump to the conclusion that he was armed with weapons. When the Jackal learns the French are looking for a Charles Calthrop, he doesn't react with any apparent concern (as might be the case if it were his real name).

In other media
In the 1973 adaptation of the novel, the Jackal is portrayed by Edward Fox. Some of the Jackal's background details are clarified: The dossier the OAS read from states that the Jackal killed Trujillo and the "fellow in the Congo" (presumably Dag Hammarskjöld or Patrice Lumumba). Within the film, his alias names vary slightly from the ones he uses in the novel.

In the 1997 remake of the original film, the Jackal is portrayed by Bruce Willis. This version of the character differs substantially from the novel and original film: in this film, he is an assassin hired by an Azerbaijani mobster to assassinate the First Lady of the United States as revenge for the death of his brother in a joint FBI-MVD raid, and characterized as a sociopath who takes pleasure in killing. He is pursued by agents of the FBI and the MVD, as well as Declan Mulqueen, a former Irish Republican Army sharpshooter who seeks revenge because the Jackal shot his former lover Isabella Zancona, causing her to miscarry their child. In the end, after Mulqueen thwarts the assassination and saves the First Lady's life, he and Zancona both gun down the Jackal. As in the novel and first film, the Jackal's real name is never revealed to both the investigators and the audience.

"Carlos the Jackal"
Real-life terrorist Ilich Ramírez Sánchez, already known under the code name "Carlos", was further nicknamed "The Jackal" after a copy of The Day of the Jackal belonging to a friend was found in his hiding place.

References

Bibliography
 Forsyth, Frederick. The Day of the Jackal. Arrow Books, 1995 (Original; Hutchinson, 1971), 
 Bookbinder, Robert. Films of the Seventies. Citadel Press, 1985. 
 Zinnemann, Fred. The Day of the Jackal, Universal Studios, 1973. (DVD)

External links 

Fictional assassins
Characters in British novels of the 20th century
Literary characters introduced in 1971
Thriller film characters
Fictional characters without a name
Fictional English people
Fiction about the Organisation armée secrète
Male characters in literature
Male literary villains
Male film villains
Action film villains
Film supervillains
Fictional marksmen and snipers